The Coal Mines (Emergency) Act 1920 (10 & 11 Geo. V c. 4) was an Act of Parliament of the United Kingdom. It became law on 31 March 1920.

It required that the profits of undertakings in the United Kingdom which operated coal mines, during the duration of the Act, were to be aggregated and distributed among the undertakings as provided in Schedule I of the Act. Assets employed in mining were not to be removed, nor profits distributed, without the consent of the Coal Controller. The Controller was permitted to make cash advances to enable the output of a mine to be maintained. Contravention of the Act, or of related orders by the Board of Trade, constituted an offence, incurring a fine of £100 plus £10 per day the offence continued. 

Subject to Schedule II, the agreement confirmed by the Coal Mines Control Agreement (Confirmation) Act 1918 was to cease from 1 April 1919 and that Act was to be repealed. The Act was to be considered as commencing from 1 April 1919 and remaining in force until 31 August 1920, when the new legislation took effect.

References
Oliver & Boyd's new Edinburgh almanac and national repository for the year 1921. p220

United Kingdom Acts of Parliament 1920
Coal mining in the United Kingdom
Coal mining law